Setareki Waganitoga Hughes (born 8 June 1995) is a Fijian footballer who plays as a midfielder for Rewa in the National Football League.

International career
Hughes was selected for the Fiji national under-20 team to compete at the 2015 FIFA U-20 World Cup in May 2015. he played in all three of Fiji's group matches against Germany, Honduras and Uzbekistan.

On 28 May 2016, he made his senior debut for the national team at the 2016 OFC Nations Cup in their 3–1 loss against New Zealand.

He was then also selected as part of the Fiji under-23 team for the 2016 Summer Olympics.

In 2019, he was selected for the 2019 Pacific Games. Fiji won a bronze medal.

International goals
Scores and results list Fiji's goal tally first.

Awards
 2016 Fiji Footballer of the Year

Private life
Setareki's brother, Bruce Hughes is also a footballer who plays for Suva as well as Fiji U-20.

References

External links

Record at FIFA Tournaments – FIFA
 

1995 births
Living people
Fijian footballers
People from Bua Province
Suva F.C. players
Rewa F.C. players
2016 OFC Nations Cup players
Footballers at the 2016 Summer Olympics
Olympic footballers of Fiji
Association football midfielders
Fiji international footballers